The men's decathlon at the 1978 European Athletics Championships was held in Prague, then Czechoslovakia, at Stadion Evžena Rošického on 30 and 31 August 1978.

Medalists

Results

Final
30/31 August

Participation
According to an unofficial count, 24 athletes from 13 countries participated in the event.

 (2)
 (1)
 (2)
 (3)
 (2)
 (2)
 (1)
 (1)
 (3)
 (2)
 (1)
 (1)
 (3)

References

Decathlon
Combined events at the European Athletics Championships